Taichang is a town under the administration of Ning County, Gansu, China. , it administers the following nine villages:
Liupu Village
Qingniu Village
Goujia Village
Xiaojia Village
Shenming Village
Lianhe Village
Dongfeng Village
Yangju Village
Xiaopanhe Village

References 

Township-level divisions of Gansu
Ning County